Sunset  is a 2018 Hungarian historical drama film directed by László Nemes and co-written by Nemes, Clara Royer and Matthieu Taponier. It is set in Budapest before World War I, starring newcomer Juli Jakab and Vlad Ivanov. It premiered at the 75th Venice International Film Festival and was also screened at the 2018 Toronto International Film Festival. It was selected as the Hungarian entry for the Best Foreign Language Film at the 91st Academy Awards, but it was not nominated.

Plot 

1913, Budapest, in the heart of Europe. The young Irisz Leiter arrives in the Hungarian capital with high hopes to work as a milliner at the legendary hat store that belonged to her late parents. She is nonetheless sent away by the new owner, Oszkár Brill. While preparations are under way at the Leiter hat store to host guests of uttermost importance, a man abruptly comes to Irisz looking for a certain Kálmán Leiter. Refusing to leave the city, the young woman follows Kálmán's tracks, her only link to a lost past. Her quest brings her through the dark streets of Budapest, where only the Leiter hat store shines, into the turmoil of a civilization on the eve of its downfall.

Cast

Production

Development
The film received €5 million from the Hungarian National Film Fund and the project is produced by Gabor Sipos and Gabor Rajna through Laokoon Filmgroup. Sunset is being sold and co-produced by French outfit Films Distribution. The film is expected to get support also from Eurimages.

Casting
Juli Jakab, who plays the protagonist of the film, was chosen among more than 1,000 Hungarian actresses.

Filming
Shooting took place between 12 June and 2 September 2017 in Hungary.

Release
Sunset premiered in competition at the 75th Venice International Film Festival on 2 September 2018. The film was released in Hungary on 27 September 2018.

Reception 
The site's critical consensus says, "Sunset (Napszállta) struggles to fill its runtime with consistently compelling drama, but uses one woman's experiences to convincingly capture a society at a crossroads." On Metacritic the film has a weighted average score of 65 out of 100 based on 23 critic reviews, indicating "generally favorable reviews".

Accolades
At the Venice Film Festival, the film won the FIPRESCI Award.

See also
 List of submissions to the 91st Academy Awards for Best Foreign Language Film
 List of Hungarian submissions for the Academy Award for Best Foreign Language Film

References

External links
 

2018 films
2010s historical drama films
Films set in 1913
Films set in Budapest
Films shot in Budapest
Films directed by László Nemes
Hungarian historical drama films
2018 drama films
Hungarian World War I films
French World War I films